In homological algebra, Whitehead's lemmas (named after J. H. C. Whitehead) represent a series of statements regarding representation theory of finite-dimensional, semisimple Lie algebras in characteristic zero. Historically, they are regarded as leading to the discovery of Lie algebra cohomology.

One usually makes the distinction between Whitehead's first and second lemma for the corresponding statements about first and second order cohomology, respectively, but there are similar statements pertaining to Lie algebra cohomology in arbitrary orders which are also attributed to Whitehead. 

The first Whitehead lemma is an important step toward the proof of Weyl's theorem on complete reducibility.

Statements
Without mentioning cohomology groups, one can state Whitehead's first lemma as follows: Let  be a finite-dimensional, semisimple Lie algebra over a field of characteristic zero, V a finite-dimensional module over it, and  a linear map such that 
. 
Then there exists a vector  such that  for all .
In terms of Lie algebra cohomology, this is, by definition, equivalent to the fact that  for every such representation.  The proof uses a Casimir element (see the proof below).

Similarly, Whitehead's second lemma states that under the conditions of the first lemma, also .

Another related statement, which is also attributed to Whitehead, describes Lie algebra cohomology in arbitrary order: Given the same conditions as in the previous two statements, but further let  be irreducible under the -action and let  act nontrivially, so . Then  for all .

Proof 
As above, let  be a finite-dimensional semisimple Lie algebra over a field of characteristic zero and  a finite-dimensional representation (which is semisimple but the proof does not use that fact).

Then define the Casimir element  by

Via , it acts on V as a linear endomorphism (namely, .) Also, 

First, suppose  is a nilpotent endomorphism. Then, by the early observation, ; that is,  is a trivial representation. Since , the condition on  implies that  for each ; i.e., the zero vector  satisfies the requirement.

Second, suppose  is an automorphism. For notational simplicity, we will drop  and write . Also let  denote the trace form used earlier. Then

Now,

Thus,

Notes

References 
 
Lie algebras